The William Marston House is a historic house located in the Marstons Mills area of Barnstable, Massachusetts.

Description and history 
The -story wood-frame house was built c. 1780 by Benjamin Marston, from the third generation of Marstons that gave the area its name. It has a five-bay facade and a large central chimney, with a centered entry framed by pilasters and topped by a transom window and entablature. The building underwent a major restoration in the 1960s.

The house was listed on the National Register of Historic Places on March 13, 1987.

See also
National Register of Historic Places listings in Barnstable County, Massachusetts

References

Houses in Barnstable, Massachusetts
National Register of Historic Places in Barnstable, Massachusetts
Houses on the National Register of Historic Places in Barnstable County, Massachusetts
Georgian architecture in Massachusetts
Houses completed in 1780